Manoptica is a Thai typeface based on Helvetica. Manoptica was developed between 1973 and 1987 by graphic designer and typographer Manop Srisomporn. Manoptica characters do not have the circular heads typical of other Thai fonts.

Variants
Variants of Manoptica include:
DB Manoptica
DB Manoptica Italic
DB Manoptica Condensed
DB Manoptica Medium
DB Manoptica Bold
DB Manoptica Extended

Use and reception
Manoptica is among the most widely used fonts in Thailand. It is commonly used in headings in advertisement and commercial art, and on street signage. In the Manoptica family, Manop 2 and Manop 5 are the most well-known. Manop 2 is mostly used in government services and individual companies. Manop 5 is mostly used in signage, with its unique opaque circular head and mixed light and bold proportions.

References

 http://anuthin.org/2012/06/25/manop-srisomporn-the-documentary-part-1/
http://www.dbfonts.biz/DBManoptica.pdf
http://www.sarakadee.com/feature/2002/09/thaifont_2.htm 
http://www.designpaibonpai.com/

Thai typefaces
Neo-grotesque sans-serif typefaces
Display typefaces
Swiss design